William Paul Luther (born June 27, 1945) is an American politician and lawyer from Minnesota. Luther was a Democratic-Farmer-Labor Party (DFL) member of the United States House of Representatives representing Minnesota's 6th congressional district from January 3, 1995, to January 3, 2003, serving four consecutive terms.

Biography 
Luther was born in Fergus Falls, Minnesota, and was educated at the University of Minnesota, receiving a Bachelor of Science in 1967 and a Juris Doctor from the Law School in 1970.

Political career 
He served on the Minnesota Governor's Council on Consumer Affairs from 1974 to 1975 and was later a member of the Minnesota House of Representatives from 1975 to 1976 and the Minnesota Senate from 1977 to 1994. During his career as a state legislator and a congressman, Luther gained an image as a moderate Democrat.

Congress 
After the 2000 census, Minnesota's congressional map was radically altered, even though the state didn't gain or lose any districts. Luther's 6th District in the northern Twin Cities suburbs was pushed slightly north and made significantly more Republican. After some consideration, Luther opted to run in the newly created 2nd District in the southern suburbs, which contained about 39 percent of his former territory. He faced a rematch against Republican John Kline, his opponent in 1998 and 2000.

During the campaign, Luther came under fire when one of his supporters, Sam Garst, filed for the race under the banner of the "No New Taxes Party." This was done in retaliation for an ad the National Republican Congressional Committee ran in support of Kline that accused Luther of being soft on crime.   Luther subsequently admitted that his campaign knew about Garst's false flag campaign. Luther never really recovered and was soundly defeated, taking 42 percent of the vote.

He served in the 104th, 105th, 106th, and 107th congresses.

In 2006, Luther entered the DFL Party primary for the office of Minnesota Attorney General after endorsed candidate Matt Entenza withdrew from the race. He lost the primary to Lori Swanson.

Ethics appointment 
He is an appointed member of the Office of Congressional Ethics, a nonpartisan, independent committee charged with overseeing outside ethics complaints against members of Congress.

Electoral history
2006 Race for state Attorney General — Democratic Primary
Lori Swanson (DFL), 42%
Steve Kelley (DFL), 37%
Bill Luther (DFL), 21%2002 Race for U.S. House of Representatives — 2nd DistrictJohn Kline (R), 53%
Bill Luther (DFL) (inc.), 42%2000 Race for U.S. House of Representatives — 6th DistrictBill Luther (DFL) (inc.), 50%
John Kline (R), 48%1998 Race for U.S. House of Representatives — 6th DistrictBill Luther (DFL) (inc.), 50%
John Kline (R), 46%1996 Race for U.S. House of Representatives — 6th DistrictBill Luther (DFL) (inc.), 56%
Tad Jude (R), 44%1994 Race for U.S. House of Representatives — 6th District'''
Bill Luther (DFL), 50%
Tad Jude (R), 50%

References

External links

 Bill Luther's Congressional Records are available for research at the Minnesota Historical Society
 

1945 births
Living people
Democratic Party members of the Minnesota House of Representatives
Democratic Party Minnesota state senators
University of Minnesota alumni
University of Minnesota Law School alumni
People from Fergus Falls, Minnesota
Democratic Party members of the United States House of Representatives from Minnesota
21st-century American politicians
Members of Congress who became lobbyists